Buddug Verona James is a Welsh mezzo-soprano opera singer who studied at the Guildhall School of Music and Drama, the National Opera Studio and in Rome.  She was born in Cardigan, Wales.

Career

Among her operatic roles James has performed Gluck's Orfeo in America and Canada, Dardano in Handel’s Amadigi in New York and Europe, and Cherubino in Mozart's The Marriage of Figaro in Tokyo and Toronto.

She has worked with Netherlands Opera, Cleveland Opera (USA), Glyndebourne, Almeida Opera, Opera Theatre Company, Opera Northern Ireland, Opera North, Opera Atelier, Opera Circus, English Pocket Opera, Opera 80, Cambridge Handel Opera Group, Operavox Cartoons, Siobhan Davies Dance Company, Music Theatre Wales and Mid Wales Opera.

On her website, James describes herself as "Opera Singer, Actress and Butcher", because before pursuing her studies she worked in one of  her father's butcher shops in Cardigan and won an award for her artistry in the Royal Welsh Show in 1978.

She has premiered in operas by Gerald Barry, Jonathan Dove, Deirdre Gribbin, Wolfgang Rihm and John Woolrich.

James has filmed numerous straight acting roles for BBC, HTV and S4C and performed Lady Capulet in Romeo and Juliet for the National Theatre of Wales.

In 2001 James and her siblings performed in the Millennium Stadium as pre-match entertainment before a Wales/Ireland rugby union match.

She is on the professorial staff in the department of Vocal and Opera Studies at the Royal Welsh College of Music & Drama (RWCMD).  She has also directed The Pirates of Penzance, Ruddigore, Acis and Galatea, Dido and Aeneas, Orpheus in the Underworld and Hercules for RWCMD.

Discography 

 Buddug Verona James - Castradïva
 Buddug Verona James - Songs of the People

She also appears on:

 Thomas Chilcot - Songs and Concertos
 The James Sisters Sing Gospel

Awards 

 Welsh Singers Competition 1986
 In 2001 James was honoured with the Druidic White Robe of Gorsedd y Beirdd at the National Eisteddfod.

Notes

External links
 Official site of Buddug Verona James
 BBC site 
 myspace.com site
 World Concert Artist Directory

Operatic mezzo-sopranos
21st-century Welsh women opera singers
Welsh mezzo-sopranos
Living people
Year of birth missing (living people)
People from Cardigan, Ceredigion